Kolar Balasubramanya Pawan (born 19 December 1987) is an Indian cricketer who played for Karnataka in domestic cricket. He is a right-handed opening batsman.

Ahead of the 2018–19 Ranji Trophy, he transferred from Karnataka to Nagaland. He was the leading run-scorer for Nagaland in the 2018–19 Vijay Hazare Trophy, with 432 runs in eight matches. However, in July 2019, the Nagaland Cricket Association (NCA) released Pawan ahead of the 2019–20 cricket season, following a poor performance in the Syed Mushtaq Ali Trophy.

References

External links

1987 births
Living people
Indian cricketers
Karnataka cricketers
South Zone cricketers
Nagaland cricketers
Cricketers from Bangalore